The Georgi Atanasov Military Sergeant's Music School was until 2001, an institution of the Bulgarian People's Army and the Bulgarian Armed Forces for military musicians. It created military music and performing staff for the brass bands of the military. It was named after Georgi Atanasov Bulgarian composer from Plovdiv.

Overview 
It was established by ministerial order of the Minister of National Defense Dobri Dzhurov on July 31, 1971. It was the successor of the previous Tchaikovsky School. It was created for the purpose of training "highly qualified and ideologically hardened music performers" for the needs of the brass bands of the Bulgarian People's Army. The co-founder of the school was Bulgarian music pedagogue Dobrin Ivanov. Admission to the school was carried out after  the 8th grade, and the term of study was 4 years. The training was carried out according to the program of other secondary music schools, as well as military band disciplines, which was recognized as regular military service. In 2001 the school was awarded the Golden Lyre Prize of the Union of Musicians for Pedagogical Achievements. The school was closed in 2001. According to Dnevnik, it was closed for financial reasons.

To this day a large part of the musicians of the Representative Guards Brass Band are graduates of this school.

Alumni 

 Captain Kalin Gemedjiev (class of 1993), conductor of the Military Brass Band at the Center for Training of Tank Units

See also 

 Moscow Military Music College
 Military Music College of Mongolia

References 

Music schools in Bulgaria
1971 establishments in Bulgaria
2001 disestablishments in Bulgaria
Bulgarian People's Army
Military education and training in Bulgaria